The SEAT 124 is a small family car produced by the Spanish manufacturer SEAT in its Zona Franca, Barcelona and Landaben, Pamplona plants between 1968 and 1980. The car was very successful in Spain having sold 896,136 units, and was produced in 4-door, 5-door station wagon (Familiar) and 2-door coupé (Sport) ( versions under various engines and trim levels.

History
The SEAT 124 model derived from the Italian Fiat 124 car and represented a great step forward for the automotive era in Spain when it was introduced. It aimed at the middle class, as it combined generous offerings and livability but at the same time in an accessible to buy and own package.

During its launch time SEAT already sold the SEAT 1500, SEAT 600D and SEAT 850 models, and by the time the 124 model was retired it was succeeded by the SEAT Ritmo, fabricated in Spain from 1979 onwards.

In 1975 the model underwent a facelift by Giorgetto Giugiaro; the circular front headlights were replaced by rectangular ones and its rear was altered amid several modifications, while the SEAT 124 and SEAT 1430 ranges were unified under a single model officially named SEAT 124D versión 75. In 1976 production of the car was transferred from the Zona Franca to the Landaben plant in Pamplona, newly acquired from Authi, resulting in the elimination of the '124 Familiar' 5-door station wagon versions.

The four-cylinder twin-barrel carburetted 1197 cc motor originally delivered 60 CV (DIN), however in 1973 a new derivative was implemented with the introduction of the SEAT 124 LS which offered 65 CV (DIN).

The variants equipped with the Twin Cam motor, victorious for decades in all-type competition, were generally known as FL which had been the internal code name used by the brand.

Its engine soon became famous for its nerve and offered high performance in many circumstances: either as a taxi cab, a police car, an ambulance, a hearse, or even a fire truck. As a race car, it won numerous competitions and trophies driven by pilots like Salvador Cañellas and Antonio Zanini amid others. Modified for this purpose in order to be used in rallies, its engine displacement was raised to reach as much as 2090 cc. In the 1977 Monte Carlo Rally, where Zanini finished third, the 124s were fitted with the same 1.8-liter 16-valve engine as the Fiat 131 Abarths.

More Sport versions were made with 1600 cc (1970–72), 1800 cc (1972–75) and 2000 cc (1978–79).

Its sibling, the SEAT 1430 also originated from the Fiat 124 range when the latter received several elements borrowed from the higher-class Fiat 125 and gave birth to the Fiat 124 Special edition presented in 1968.

Versions
 1: SEAT 124 (FA) 1968-1971
 2: SEAT 124 Lujo (FB) and SEAT 124 L (FB-02) 1968-1971
 3: SEAT 124 D (FA-03) 1971-1975
 4: SEAT 124 D Lujo (FB-03) 1971-1973
 5: SEAT 124 LS (FB-05) 1973-1974
 6: SEAT 124 D "Extras" (FB-11) 1974-1975
 7: SEAT 124 D Versión ´75 (FL-00) 1975-1980
 8: SEAT 124 D Versión ´75 LS (FL-03...) 1975-1980
 9: SEAT 124 D Versión ´75 Especial 1430 ( FL-10/11/12) 1975-1980
 10: SEAT 124 D Versión ´75 Especial 1600 (FL-40/45) 1976-1979
 11: SEAT 124 D Versión ´75 Especial 1800 (FL-80/82) 1976-1978
 12: SEAT 124 D Versión ´75 Especial 2000 (FL-90) 1978-1979
 13: SEAT 124 5p (FJ) / SEAT 124 D 5p (FJ-02) / SEAT 124 D Versión ´75 5p (FN) 1969-1976

References

124
1970s cars
1980s cars
Cars introduced in 1968
Station wagons